The China women's national tennis team represents China in Fed Cup tennis competition and is governed by the Chinese Tennis Association.

History
China competed in its first Fed Cup in 1981.

China competed at the World Group level in 2007 through 2009. 

China enjoyed their best Billie Jean King Cup performance in 2008 when they reached the semi-finals.

Current team (2022)
 Zhu Lin
 Wang Qiang
 Yuan Yue
 Zheng Qinwen
 Wang Xinyu

Current Results

See also
 Fed Cup
 China Davis Cup team
 Tennis in China

References

External links
 

Billie Jean King Cup teams
Fed Cup
Fed Cup